Paulo Sérgio Soares Marinheiro, known as Paulo Sérgio (born 14 December 1971) is a former Portuguese football player.

Club career
He made his Primeira Liga debut for Beira-Mar on 15 November 1998 in a game against Farense.

Honours
Beira-Mar
Taça de Portugal: 1998–99

References

External links
 

1971 births
People from Ovar
Living people
Portuguese footballers
C.D. Feirense players
Liga Portugal 2 players
S.C. Beira-Mar players
Primeira Liga players
Leixões S.C. players
F.C. Marco players
SC São João de Ver players
R.D. Águeda players
FC Pampilhosa players
A.D. Sanjoanense players
C.F. União de Lamas players
Association football forwards
Sportspeople from Aveiro District